The first international visit to the United States was made by King Kalakaua of Hawaii in 1874, which was the first visit by a foreign chief of state or head of government.[1]

The first North American head of state to visit the United States was President Justo Rufino Barrios of Guatemala in 1882.

Antigua and Barbuda

Bahamas

Barbados

Belize

Canada

Costa Rica

Cuba

Grenada

Guatemala

Dominica

Dominican Republic

El Salvador

Haiti

Honduras

Jamaica

Mexico

Panama

Nicaragua

Saint Kitts and Nevis

Saint Lucia

Saint Vincent and the Grenadines

Trinidad and Tobago

See also

 Foreign policy of the United States
 Foreign relations of the United States
 List of international trips made by presidents of the United States
 List of diplomatic visits to the United States
 State visit

References

External links
 Visits by Foreign Leaders – Office of the Historian (United States Department of State)

North America and the Caribbean